Yığmatepe, historically and still informally called Kemnun or Kemlim, is a village in the Şahinbey District, Gaziantep Province, Turkey. The village is inhabited by Turkmens of various tribes and had a population of 328 in 2022.

References

Villages in Şahinbey District